Denilson Antonio Paludo (born October 8, 1972) is a former Brazilian football player.

Club statistics

References

External links

1972 births
Living people
Brazilian footballers
Brazilian expatriate footballers
J1 League players
Expatriate footballers in Japan
Yokohama Flügels players
Association football midfielders